These are the results for the girls' singles event at the 2010 Summer Youth Olympics.

Seeds

  (second round)
  (first round)
  (semifinals, 4th place)
  (first round)
  (second round)
  (first round)
  (semifinals, bronze medalist)
  (quarterfinals)

Main draw

Finals

Top half

Bottom half

Consolation draw

References
Singles draw
Consolation draw

Tennis at the 2010 Summer Youth Olympics